Colin Egglesfield (born February 9, 1973) is an American actor. He is known for his roles as Josh Madden in the long-running soap opera All My Children, Auggie Kirkpatrick on The CW's short-lived drama series Melrose Place, and Evan Parks on The Client List.

Early life
Egglesfield was born in Farmington Hills, Michigan, the second child of Kathleen (née Dineen) and William Egglesfield, a physician. His mother is Irish. He has two siblings: an older sister, Kerry, and a younger brother, Sean. He was brought up in a Catholic household.

Shy in his adolescent years, he credits his prep football coach, Dave Mattio, with helping gain a positive self-esteem. After Egglesfield graduated from Marian Catholic High School in Chicago Heights, he attended Illinois Wesleyan University and played for the football team. He transferred to the University of Iowa, where he was in the pre-med program. After he received his BS from Iowa he backpacked throughout Europe.

To earn money for medical school, Egglesfield turned to modeling. He won a contest after entering at the urging of a friend, and  left medicine behind for a modeling career. He is signed with Beatrice Model agency in Milan, Italy, and DNA Model Management in New York City. He modeled for Versace, Calvin Klein, and Armani, among others before he started acting. In the late 1990s, he was featured on the covers of Vogue Italia (shot by Steven Meisel) and L'Uomo Vogue (twice, photographed by Bruce Weber and Ellen Von Unwerth respectively).

Career
After taking drama classes, Egglesfield found himself guest starring on television series such as Law & Order: Special Victims Unit, The $treet, Gilmore Girls, Charmed, and Nip/Tuck. He also had a small role in the 2005 film Must Love Dogs, in addition to many other minor film projects. On September 26, 2005, he made his debut on All My Children, taking over the role of Josh Madden from his short-lived predecessor Scott Kinworthy. In 2005, Egglesfield was named one of People magazine's "Sexiest Men Alive".  In 2006, he attended the Cackalacky Film Festival in Charlotte, N.C., where his film Beautiful Dreamer was awarded Best American Full Feature Film.

Beginning in the fall of 2009, Egglesfield portrayed chef/surfer guy Auggie Kirkpatrick in The CW's 2009 series Melrose Place. However, due to a change in the direction of the show, Egglesfield and his co-star Ashlee Simpson-Wentz were fired and his character was written out of the show during the thirteenth episode.  In 2011, he starred in the film adaptation of Something Borrowed opposite Kate Hudson. As of August 2011, Egglesfield plays the recurring role of Tommy Rizzoli on TNT's Rizzoli & Isles. From 2012 to 2013, he starred as Evan Parks on the Lifetime drama series The Client List.

He owns and runs his own New York City-based clothing company Shout Out Clothing!, which he principally uses as a vehicle to promote and support educational initiatives such as Project Grad, and also "Stay in school" programs.

Filmography

References

External links
 
 

1973 births
21st-century American male actors
American male film actors
Male models from Michigan
American male soap opera actors
American male television actors
American people of Irish descent
Living people
Male actors from Michigan
People from Farmington Hills, Michigan
University of Iowa alumni
Illinois Wesleyan Titans football players
People from Morris, Illinois